is a Japanese multimedia franchise. It consists of a manga series, titled Gekidol Alive, which has been serialized in Dengeki Maoh since December 2016, an OVA, titled Alice in Deadly School, released in January 2021, an anime television series, which aired from January to March 2021, and a stage play.

Characters

Media

Manga
A manga series written by Kazuya Hatazawa and illustrated by Asami Sekiya, titled , began serialization in Dengeki Maoh on December 27, 2016.

OVA
An original video animation (OVA), titled , was announced in August 2016. It was produced by Hoods Entertainment, with direction by Shigeyasu Yamauchi, Yume Kageyama writing the scripts, Kiyoshi Tateishi designing the characters, and Prhythm/epx composing the music. The OVA premiered on January 4, 2021. It was streamed by Funimation outside of Asia.

Anime
The project was first announced in December 2015. In September 2020, it was announced the series would be produced by Hoods Entertainment and directed by Shigeru Ueda, with the chief writer being Keiichirō Ōchi and series composition credited 
to the Gekidol Production Committee, Kiyoshi Tateishi designing the characters, and Prhythm/epx composing the music. The series aired on AT-X from January 5 to March 23, 2021.

Internationally, the series was also streamed by Funimation outside of Asia. On February 13, 2022, Funimation announced the series would receive an English dub, which premiered the following day.

Episode list

Stage play
A stage play was shown in the Theater Sun-mall in Tokyo from March 3 to March 7, 2021.

Reception
The reviewers at Anime News Network felt the premiere was dull and tried to do too much. Anime Feminist concurred, calling it boring and nothing special.

Notes

References

External links
  
 

2021 anime television series debuts
ASCII Media Works manga
AT-X (TV network) original programming
Crunchyroll anime
Hoods Entertainment
Japanese idols in anime and manga
Seinen manga